The European Convention on Mutual Assistance in Criminal Matters is a 1959 Council of Europe mutual legal assistance treaty. It has been ratified by 50 states including all 46 member states of the Council of Europe.

The parties to the Convention agree to offer each other "the widest measure of mutual assistance" in investigating crimes, procuring evidence, and in prosecuting criminal suspects. The Convention specifies the requirements that requests for legal assistance and letters rogatory from the "requesting state" to the "requested state" have to meet. The Convention also sets out rules for the enforcement of such letters rogatory by the authorities of the requested state.

The Convention was concluded in Strasbourg, France, on 20 April 1959 and entered into force on 12 June 1962. In 2009, San Marino became the 47th and final member state of the Council of Europe to ratify the Convention, making it one of the few universal Conventions amongst member states of the Council. The Convention has also been ratified by Chile, Russia, Israel, and South Korea.

See also
List of Council of Europe treaties

External links
European Convention on Mutual Assistance in Criminal Matters, Council of Europe information page
Text
Signatures and ratifications

European Convention on Mutual Assistance in Criminal Matters
Council of Europe treaties
European Convention on Mutual Assistance in Criminal Matters
European Convention on Mutual Assistance in Criminal Matters
European Convention on Mutual Assistance in Criminal Matters
Treaties of Albania
Treaties of Andorra
Treaties of Armenia
Treaties of Austria
Treaties of Azerbaijan
Treaties of Belgium
Treaties of Bosnia and Herzegovina
Treaties of Bulgaria
Treaties of Chile
Treaties of Croatia
Treaties of Cyprus
Treaties of the Czech Republic
Treaties of Czechoslovakia
Treaties of Denmark
Treaties of Estonia
Treaties of Finland
Treaties of France
Treaties of Georgia (country)
Treaties of West Germany
Treaties of the Kingdom of Greece
Treaties of Hungary
Treaties of Iceland
Treaties of Ireland
Treaties of Israel
Treaties of Italy
Treaties of Latvia
Treaties of Liechtenstein
Treaties of Lithuania
Treaties of Luxembourg
Treaties of North Macedonia
Treaties of Malta
Treaties of Moldova
Treaties of Monaco
Treaties of Montenegro
Treaties of the Netherlands
Treaties of Norway
Treaties of Poland
Treaties of Portugal
Treaties of South Korea
Treaties of Romania
Treaties of Russia
Treaties of San Marino
Treaties of Serbia and Montenegro
Treaties of Slovakia
Treaties of Slovenia
Treaties of Spain
Treaties of Sweden
Treaties of Switzerland
Treaties of Turkey
Treaties of Ukraine
Treaties of the United Kingdom
Treaties extended to the Faroe Islands
Treaties extended to Greenland
Treaties extended to Clipperton Island
Treaties extended to French Polynesia
Treaties extended to the French Southern and Antarctic Lands
Treaties extended to Mayotte
Treaties extended to New Caledonia
Treaties extended to Saint Pierre and Miquelon
Treaties extended to Wallis and Futuna
Treaties extended to the Netherlands Antilles
Treaties extended to Aruba
Treaties extended to Guernsey
Treaties extended to the Isle of Man
Treaties extended to Jersey

fr:Convention européenne d'entraide judiciaire en matière pénale